Mr Noah is the first EP by American recording artist Panda Bear, released in 2014. The title track was later featured on the 2015 full-length album Panda Bear Meets the Grim Reaper, while the other three songs were not.

Track listing

References 

2014 debut EPs
Domino Recording Company EPs
Panda Bear (musician) albums